The Sheriff of Sutherland was historically a royal appointment, held at pleasure, which carried the responsibility for enforcing justice in the sheriffdom of Sutherland, Scotland. It became a heritable post in the hands of the Earls of Sutherland until 1747, when it reverted, in combination with Caithness, to being a Royal appointment, usually for life.

From 1806 to 1857 the sheriffdom again existed in its own right, after which it was once again merged with Caithness.

Sheriffs of Sutherland
Family of the Earl of Sutherland, –1747
1747–1806 See Sheriff of Caithness and Sutherland
George Cranstoun, Lord Corehouse, 1806–1819 
Charles Ross of Invercarron, 1819–1827 
Hugh Lumsden of Pitcaple, 1827–1857 
 For sheriffs after 1857 see Sheriff of Caithness and Sutherland

See also
 Historical development of Scottish sheriffdoms

References

sheriffs